New York State Route 3A (NY 3A) is a county-maintained state highway in Jefferson County, New York, in the United States. The route is an alternate route of NY 3 between the village of Deferiet and Fargo, a hamlet within the town of Wilna. While NY 3 veers south to serve the village of Carthage, NY 3A follows a direct east–west alignment between the two communities. The eastern half of the route passes through the Fort Drum limits. All of NY 3A is co-designated as County Route 36 (CR 36) and is co-signed as such.

The origins of the route date back to the 1930s when it was first designated as part of NY 3. The alignments of NY 3 and New York State Route 3G between Deferiet and Fargo were flipped , placing NY 3 on its modern alignment via Carthage and NY 3G on modern NY 3A. The NY 3G designation was eliminated in the 1940s. Its former alignment went unnumbered until September 1950, when it was redesignated as NY 3A.

Route description

NY 3A begins at an intersection with NY 3 in the village of Deferiet. It heads northeastward, passing to the south of the village center as it heads through an undeveloped area of the community. It continues across a small canal and past a chemical plant before turning eastward and leaving the Deferiet village limits. The route heads on through the town of Wilna, passing through a small, unnamed community built up around CR 37 and little else before entering the limits of Fort Drum. While in Fort Drum, NY 3A heads through a dense forest as it heads across an area with no development whatsoever. This trend finally ceases in the small hamlet of Fargo, where NY 3A passes by a handful of buildings before ending at another junction with NY 3. All of NY 3A is maintained by Jefferson County; as a result, it is co-designated and co-signed as CR 36.

History
NY 3 originally went through Carthage on its way from Deferiet to Fargo. It was realigned  to bypass Carthage to the north on modern NY 3A. The former routing of NY 3 between Deferiet and Carthage was originally designated as NY 3F; however, it was redesignated as NY 3G by the following year. NY 3 was moved back to the Deferiet–Carthage–Fargo alignment  while the NY 3G designation was transferred to the former routing of NY 3 between Deferiet and Fargo. The NY 3G designation was removed in the 1940s. Its former routing remained unnumbered until September 1950, when it was redesignated as NY 3A.

In 2016, a study by the Missile Defense Agency of the United States Department of Defense proposed the idea of shutting down NY 3A to the public for a missile defense site at Fort Drum. Ceasing to be a public highway, the traffic that would follow NY 3A (AADT of 2,298) would be directed onto NY 3 directly through the village of Carthage.

Major intersections

See also

List of county routes in Jefferson County, New York

References

External links

003A
Transportation in Jefferson County, New York